Ueekenkcoracias is an extinct genus of primobucconid bird in the order Coraciiformes from the Huitrera Formation of Patagonia. A relatively large member of the stem-Coracii, Ueekenkcoracias possessed a robust femur and stout tibiotarsus, with a strongly projected facies articularis medialis.

Etymology 
The generic name of Ueekenkcoracias is derived from the native Tehuelche word ueekenk, meaning "outsider" in reference to its unusual presence in South America, and the genus name Coracias. The specific epithet honors Claudia Patricia Tambussi, who contributed hugely to paleornithology, particularly in South America.

Description 
The holotype specimen of Ueekenkcoracias consists of an incomplete right leg, preserved as a part and counterpart. As in all Coraciiformes, the tibiotarsus of the holotype is short and stout, proportionally longer than in Eocoracias. The crista cnemialis cranialis is triangular and small, but more developed than that of Eocoracias and Paracoracias. It is not, however, as reduced as in rollers, kingfishers and bee-eaters. The diaphysis of the tibiotarsus is relatively stout, and laterally curved. The pons supratendineus has a transverse disposition, as in Geranopteridae and motmots and is located medially on the shaft as in rollers and ground rollers. The distal epiphysis widens distally, as in rollers, ground rollers and todies, but not as much as Leptosomidae. The condylus medialis is strongly projected caudally, similar to the condition of kingfishers, and contrary to motmots.

The tarsometatarsus of Ueekenkcoracias is short and wide, resembling the condition of Primobucconidae, Parvicuculus, Eocoracidae, kingfishers and bee-eaters, measuring less than half the tibiotarsus's length, but distinct from the more elongated tarsometatarsus of geranopterids. It is also contrary to the condition in ground rollers, todies and motmots, all of which have greatly elongated and slender tarsometatarsi.

Taxonomy 
Ueekenkcoracias appears to the most basal member of the Coracii, a position supported by the absence of derived features shared by all coraciians except Ueekenkcoracias, including a tarsometatarsus with a deep infracotylar fossa. Below is a phylogeny from Degrange et al (2021):

References 

Coraciiformes
Extinct birds of South America
Birds described in 2021
Fossils of Argentina
Fossil taxa described in 2021
Paleogene Argentina